Sarayönü is a town and district of Konya Province in the Central Anatolia region of Turkey. According to 2000 census, population of the district is 36,525 of which 10,386 live in the town of Sarayönü.

Notes

References

External links
 District municipality's official website 

Populated places in Konya Province
Districts of Konya Province
Important Bird Areas of Turkey
Lycaonia